Pontiac—Témiscamingue was a federal electoral district in Quebec, Canada, that was represented in the House of Commons of Canada from 1949 to 1968.

This riding was created in 1947 from Pontiac riding.

It was defined to consist of:
 the county of Pontiac;
 the towns of Belleterre and Témiscamingue and the county of Témiscamingue, except the township of Montreuil, Rémigny, Beaumesnil, Clérion, Chabert, Landanet, Mazérac, Jourdan, Pélissier and Granet and all the townships situated north of Granet.

In 1966, it was split into the new electoral districts of Pontiac and Témiscamingue.

Members of Parliament

This riding elected the following Members of Parliament:

Election results

N.B. Mr. Martineau elected by the casting vote of the Returning Officer

See also 

 List of Canadian federal electoral districts
 Past Canadian electoral districts

External links 
 Riding history from the Library of Parliament

References

Former federal electoral districts of Quebec